Ken Barr, working name of Kenneth Barr (17 March 1933 – 25 March 2016), was a Scottish artist who drew and painted DC and Marvel comics and magazines, Doc Savage magazine covers, science fiction and fantasy novel and magazine covers.  His style evolved into powerful "photo-realism" depictions of heroes similar to the paintings of James Bama.

References

1933 births
2016 deaths
Scottish comics artists